John Lee Curtis "Sonny Boy" Williamson (March 30, 1914 – June 1, 1948) was an American blues harmonica player, singer and songwriter. He is often regarded as the pioneer of the blues harp as a solo instrument. He played on hundreds of recordings by many pre–World War II blues artists. Under his own name, he was one of the most recorded blues musicians of the 1930s and 1940s and is closely associated with Chicago producer Lester Melrose and Bluebird Records. His popular songs, original or adapted, include "Good Morning, School Girl", "Sugar Mama", "Early in the Morning", and "Stop Breaking Down".

Williamson's harmonica style was a great influence on postwar performers. Later in his career, he was a mentor to many up-and-coming blues musicians who moved to Chicago, including Muddy Waters. In an attempt to capitalize on Williamson's fame, Aleck "Rice" Miller began recording and performing as Sonny Boy Williamson in the early 1940s, and later, to distinguish the two, John Lee Williamson came to be known as Sonny Boy Williamson I or "the original Sonny Boy".

Biography and career
Williamson was born in Madison County, Tennessee, near Jackson, in 1914. His original recordings are in the country blues style, but he soon demonstrated skill at making the harmonica a lead instrument for the blues and popularized it for the first time in a more urban blues setting. He has been called "the father of modern blues harp". While in his teens he joined Yank Rachell and Sleepy John Estes, playing with them in Tennessee and Arkansas. In 1934 he settled in Chicago.

Williamson first recorded in 1937, for Bluebird Records, and his first recording, "Good Morning, School Girl", became a standard. He was popular among black audiences throughout the southern United States and in Midwestern industrial cities, such as Detroit and Chicago, and his name was synonymous with the blues harmonica for the next decade. Other well-known recordings of his include "Sugar Mama Blues", "Shake the Boogie", "Better Cut That Out", "Sloppy Drunk", "Early in the Morning", "Stop Breaking Down", and "Hoodoo Hoodoo" (also known as "Hoodoo Man Blues"). In 1947, "Shake the Boogie" made number 4 on Billboard'''s Race Records chart. Williamson's style influenced many blues harmonica performers, including Billy Boy Arnold, Junior Wells, Sonny Terry, Little Walter, and Snooky Pryor. He was the most widely heard and influential blues harmonica player of his generation. His music was also influential on many of his non-harmonica-playing contemporaries and successors, including Muddy Waters (who played guitar with Williamson in the mid-1940s) and Jimmy Rogers (whose first recording in 1946 was as a harmonica player, performing an uncanny imitation of Williamson's style). These and other artists, both blues and rock, have helped popularize his songs through subsequent recordings.

Williamson recorded prolifically both as a bandleader and as a sideman over the course of his career, mainly for Bluebird. Before Bluebird moved to Chicago, where it eventually became part of RCA Records, many early sessions took place at the Leland Tower, a hotel in Aurora, Illinois. The top-floor nightclub at the Leland, known as the Sky Club, was used for live broadcasts of big bands on a local radio station and, during off hours, served as a recording studio for Williamson's early sessions and those of other Bluebird artists.

Death and legacy
Williamson's final recording session took place in Chicago in December 1947, in which he accompanied Big Joe Williams. On June 1, 1948, Williamson was killed in a robbery on Chicago's South Side as he walked home from a performance at the Plantation Club, at 31st St. and Giles Avenue, a tavern just a block and a half from his home, at 3226 S. Giles. Williamson's final words are reported to have been "Lord have mercy".

Williamson is buried at the former site of the Blairs Chapel Church, southwest of Jackson, Tennessee. In 1991, a red granite marker was purchased by fans and family to mark the site of his burial. A Tennessee historical marker, also placed in 1991, indicates the place of his birth and describes his influence on blues music.

Name issues
His legacy has been somewhat overshadowed in the postwar blues era by the popularity of the musician who appropriated his name, Rice Miller. The recordings made by Williamson between 1937 and his death in 1948 and those made later by Rice Miller were all originally issued under the name Sonny Boy Williamson. It is believed that Miller adopted the name to deceive audiences (and his first record label) into thinking that he was the "original" Sonny Boy. In order to differentiate between the two musicians, many later scholars and biographers have referred to John Lee Williamson (1914–1948) as Sonny Boy Williamson I and Miller (c. 1912–1965) as Sonny Boy Williamson II.

To add to the confusion, around 1940 the jazz pianist and singer Enoch Williams recorded for Decca under the name Sonny Boy Williams and in 1947 as Sunny Boy in the Sunny Boy Trio.

Discography

Compilation albums
Williamson's recordings were issued on 78 rpm records by Bluebird Records (a subsidiary of RCA Victor Records) or, after the label was discontinued, RCA Victor.  Over the years, RCA has released several compilations of Williamson's material, including:Big Bill & Sonny Boy (Side 2 only) (RCA, 1964)Bluebird Blues (RCA, 1970)Rare Sonny Boy (1937-1947) (RCA, 1988)
 RCA Blues & Heritage Series: The Bluebird Recordings, 1937-1938 (RCA, 1997)
 RCA Blues & Heritage Series: The Bluebird Recordings, 1938 (RCA, 1997)
 When The Sun Goes Down: The Secret History of Rock & Roll, Vol. 8: Bluebird Blues (RCA Victor, 2003)
Specialty labels, such as JSP Records, Saga, Indigo, Snapper, and others, have also released compilations. In 1991, Document Records issued Williamson's Complete Recorded Works In Chronological Order'' as five CDs.

References

External links
Blues Foundation Hall of Fame
Sonny Boy Williamson gravesite and historical marker
 Sonny Boy Williamson recordings at the Discography of American Historical Recordings.

1914 births
1948 deaths
People from Jackson, Tennessee
African-American male songwriters
Blues musicians from Tennessee
Songwriters from Tennessee
Harmonica blues musicians
Chicago blues musicians
Country blues musicians
American blues singers
American blues harmonica players
Murdered African-American people
American murder victims
Bluebird Records artists
People murdered in Illinois
Male murder victims
1948 murders in the United States
20th-century African-American male singers